Despite its relatively small population, Austria has produced many great athletes in several sports including skiing, Formula One, mountaineering and tennis. Below is a list of Austrian athletes, organized by sport.

Fencing 

 Albert Bogen (Albert Bógathy) (1882-1961), saber fencer, Olympic silver
 Siegfried "Fritz" Flesch (1872-1939), sabre fencer, Olympic bronze
  Dr. Otto Herschmann (1877-1942), saber fencer, Olympic silver; 100-m freestyle in swimming, Olympic silver
 Ellen Preis (1912-2007), foil fencer, 3-time world champion (1947, 1949, and 1950), Olympic champion, 17-time Austrian champion

Formula One 

Austria has produced two Formula One champions, Jochen Rindt and Niki Lauda.  The following is a list of drivers. 
 Gerhard Berger (1959-)
 Harald Ertl (1948-1982), Died in 1982 due to an aircraft accident
 Patrick Friesacher (1980-), Drove for Minardi in 2005, scoring three points in the infamous 2005 United States Grand Prix
 Christian Klien (1983-), Drove for Red Bull Racing and HRT in F1.
 Niki Lauda (1949-2019), three time Formula one world champion
 Roland Ratzenberger (1960-1994), died in 1994 due to race related accident
 Jochen Rindt (1942-1970), Formula one world champion, died in 1970 due to race related accident
 Karl Wendlinger (1968-), currently driving in the FIA GT Championship
 Alexander Wurz (1974-), currently driving for Honda (as a test driver)

Football 
The Bundesliga is Austria's professional football league. Among its better-known clubs are Red Bull Salzburg, Rapid Wien and Sturm Graz.  Below is a list of football players from Austria.

 David Alaba (1992-) – player
 Marko Arnautović (1989-) – player
 Stefan Bliem (1983-) – goalkeeper
 Otto Fischer (1901–1941), footballer and coach
 Toni Fritsch (1945-2005), former Austrian football player and former placekicker for several National Football League teams (American football)
 Andreas Herzog (1968-)
 Josef Hickersberger (1948-), football player and coach
 Hans Krankl (1953-), footballer and coach
 Božo Kovačević (1979-)
 Emanuel Pogatetz (1983-)
 Toni Polster (1964-)
 Herbert Prohaska (1955-)
 Helmut Riegler (1976-)
 Harald Ruckendorfer (1982-)
 Paul Scharner (1980-) – player
 Max Scheuer, footballer; national team
Heinrich Schönfeld (born 1900), football player
 Matthias Sindelar (1903-1939), nicknamed "the Mozart of football", Voted the greatest Austrian football player of all time.

Hockey 

Below is a partial list of hockey people from Austria.
 Christoph Brandner, NHL hockey player
 André Burakovsky, Austria-born Swedish, left wing (Colorado Avalanche)
 Robert Burakovsky, Sweden, right wing (NHL)
 Reinhard Divis, NHL hockey player
 Hans Dobida, inductee into the IIHF Hall of Fame
 Michael Grabner
 Thomas Vanek, NHL hockey player
 Walter Wasservogel, inductee into the IIHF Hall of Fame

Mountaineering 

On 5 of the 14 Eight-thousanders, Austrians have made the first ascent, more than any other nation.  Below is a partial list of mountaineers from Austria.
 Karl Blodig, first to climb all alpine mountains above 4000m
 Hermann Buhl, first ascent of Nanga Parbat (1953), first ascent of Broad Peak (1957)
 Kurt Diemberger, first ascents of Broad Peak (1957) and Dhaulagiri (1960)
 Peter Habeler, first ascent of Mount Everest without oxygen (together with Reinhold Messner)
 Heinrich Harrer, first ascent of the Carstensz Pyramid
 Fritz Moravec, first ascent of Gasherbrum II together with Josef Larch and Hans Willenpart
 Ludwig Purtscheller, first ascent of Kilimanjaro (1889)
 Marcus Schmuck, first ascent of Broad Peak (1957), initiator and leader of the OEAV Karakoram Expedition
 Herbert Tichy, first ascent of Cho Oyu
 Fritz Wintersteller, first ascent of Broad Peak (1957)

Sailing

 Andreas Geritzer, sailor
 Roman Hagara, sailor (Olympic champion 2000 & 2004 with Hans-Peter Steinacher)
 Hans-Peter Steinacher, sailor (Olympic champion 2000 & 2004 with Roman Hagara)

Skating

 Fritzi Burger, figure skater, Olympic 2x silver, World Championship 2x silver
 Emese Hunyady, speed skater (Olympic champion 1994)
 Felix Kasper, figure skater, Olympic bronze

Skiing 

Austria has been the birthplace of many great skiers and is 5th in the all-time Winter Olympics medal count.  It has won more alpine skiing world cups than any other nation (both individually and nationally). Below is a list of famous skiers from Austria.
 Armin Assinger (1964-)
 Michaela Dorfmeister (1973-), Olympic champion
 Christoph Ebenbichler (1983-)
 Stephan Eberharter (1969-), Olympic champion
 Anna Fenninger (1969-), Olympic champion
 Andreas Goldberger (1972-), ski jumper
 Renate Götschl (1975-)
 Christl Haas (1943-2001)
 Hansi Hinterseer (1954-)
 Marcel Hirscher (1989-)
 Franz Klammer (1953-)
 Hermann Maier (1972-), Olympic champion
 Ulrike Maier, Olympic ski champion (1967–1994)
 Annemarie Moser-Pröll (1953-), Olympic champion
 Patrick Ortlieb (1967-), Olympic champion
 Benjamin Raich (1978-), Olympic champion
 Toni Sailer (1935-2009), Won all three gold medals, earning himself the Triple Crown of Alpine Skiing
 Karl Schnabl (1954-), ski jumper
 Karl Schranz (1938-)
 Thomas Stangassinger (1965-), Olympic champion
 Hubert Strolz (1962-), Olympic champion
 Ernst Vettori (1964-), ski jumper
 Anita Wachter (1967-), Olympic champion
 Felix Gottwald (1976-), Olympic champion

Swimming 

 Margarete "Grete" Adler, Olympic bronze (4x100-meter freestyle relay)
 Hedy Bienenfeld (1907–1976), Austrian-American Olympic swimmer
 Alfred Guth (1908–1996), Austrian-born American water polo player, swimmer, and Olympic modern pentathlete 
 Judith Haspel (born "Judith Deutsch"), held every Austrian women's middle and long distance freestyle record in 1935
 Otto Herschmann, Olympic silver (100-m freestyle)
 Mirna Jukić, swimmer
 Ruth Langer (1921-1999), Austrian swimmer
Fritzi Löwy (1910–1994), Olympic swimmer
 Klara Milch, Olympic bronze (4x100-m freestyle relay)
 Paul Neumann, Olympic champion (500-m freestyle)
 Maxim Podoprigora, Olympic swimmer
Shoshana Ribner, Israeli Olympic swimmer
 Markus Rogan, swimmer
 Otto Scheff (born "Otto Sochaczewsky"), Olympic champion (400-m freestyle) and 2x bronze (400-m freestyle, 1,500-m freestyle)
 Josephine Sticker, Olympic bronze (4x100-m freestyle relay)
 Otto Wahle, 2x Olympic silver (1,000-m freestyle, 200-m obstacle race) and bronze (400-m freestyle); International Swimming Hall of Fame

Table tennis

 Richard Bergmann, table tennis, 7-time world champion, Hall of Fame
 Erwin Kohn, table tennis world champion
 Alfred Liebster, table tennis player
 Werner Schlager, table tennis player (world champion 2003)

Tennis 
In recent years Austria's presence on the international tennis scene has grown significantly. The national teams on the Davis and Federation cups have achieved improved rankings.  Austria has also produced a former world number one and French Open champion in Thomas Muster. Below is a list of prominent Austrian tennis players.
 Sybille Bammer

 Eva Duldig (born 1938), Austrian-born Australian and Dutch tennis player, author
 Werner Eschauer
 Nikola Hofmanova
 Melanie Klaffner
 Julian Knowle
 Daniel Köllerer
 Stefan Koubek
 Oliver Marach
 Patricia Mayr
 Jürgen Melzer
 Yvonne Meusburger
 Uberto De Morpurgo (1896–1961), Austrian-born Italian tennis player, World No. 8
 Thomas Muster, former World No. 1, 1995 French Open Champion
 Tamira Paszek
 Barbara Paulus
 Alexander Peya
 Felix Pipes, Olympic silver (doubles)
 Sylvia Plischke
 Barbara Schett
  Dominic Thiem, 2020 US Open Champion 
 Barbara Schwartz

Weightlifting

 Robert Fein (1907-1975), Olympic Champion weightlifter
 Hans Haas, weightlifter, Olympic champion (lightweight), silver
 Mickey Hirschl, weightlifting junior champion

Wrestling

 Mickey Hirschl, wrestler, 2x Olympic bronze (heavyweight freestyle and Greco-Roman)
 Fred Oberlander, wrestler; world champion (freestyle heavyweight)

Other notables in sport

 Edin Ibrahimovic, volleyball player 
 Kate Allen, triathlete (Olympic champion 2004)
 Toni Fritsch, NFL football player, Super Bowl VI champion
 Stephanie Graf, runner (not related to German tennis player Steffi Graf)
 Alfred Guth (1908–1996), Austrian-born American water polo player, swimmer, and Olympic modern pentathlete 
 Walter Hahn, professional wrestler
 Claudia Heill, judoka
 Mickey Hirschl, wrestler, 2x Olympic bronze (heavyweight freestyle and Greco-Roman), shot put and discus junior champion, weightlifting junior champion, and pentathlon champion
Alfred König (1913-1987), Austrian-Turkish Olympic sprinter
 Sylven Landesberg (born 1990), American-Israeli-Austrian basketball player 
 Manfred Magnus (born 1939), motorcycle racer
 Jasmin Ouschan, pool-billiards player
 Rowby-John Rodriguez, darts player
 Nicole Trimmel, kickboxer
 Arnold Schwarzenegger, body builder
 Peter Seisenbacher, judoka (Olympic champion 1984 & 1988)
 Christoph Sieber, surfer (Olympic champion 2000)
 Mensur Suljović, darts player
 Elisabeth Theurer, horse rider
 Georg Totschnig, cyclist
 Christine Wolf, golfer

References 

Austria